Tommy Hall may refer to:
 Tommy Hall (cyclist) (1887–1949), British cyclist
 Tommy Hall (footballer, born 1876), English footballer
 Tommy Hall (footballer, born 1891), English football inside forward with Sunderland, Newcastle and Gillingham
 Tommy Hall (footballer, born 1908) (1908–1973), English football wing half with Darlington
 Tommy Hall (musician) (born 1943), American musician with the band 13th Floor Elevators

See also
Thomas Hall (disambiguation)
Tom Hall (disambiguation)